The 1947 Mississippi gubernatorial election took place on November 4, 1947, in order to elect the Governor of Mississippi. Incumbent Democrat Fielding L. Wright, who had succeeded to the governorship a year prior following the death of Thomas L. Bailey, ran for election to a first full term.

As was common at the time, the Democratic candidate won in a landslide so therefore the Democratic primary was the real contest, and winning the primary was considered tantamount to election. In fact, this was the first election since 1881 in which the Republican Party even fielded a nominal candidate, former Governor of Nebraska George L. Sheldon, and the first since 1919 in which any opposition party did.

Democratic primary
In the Democratic primary, incumbent Governor Fielding L. Wright defeated lawyer Paul B. Johnson Jr., the son of former Governor Paul B. Johnson Sr., and 3 other candidates. He received a majority (55%) of the vote, thereby eliminating the need for a runoff.

Results

General election

Campaign
In the general election, Wright ran against Republican George L. Sheldon, who served as Governor of Nebraska from 1907 until 1909. Sheldon moved to Mississippi after his service as governor and served in the Mississippi House of Representatives, becoming an influential figure in the state Republican Party. However, the Republicans had such minimal influence in Mississippi at the time that Wright won in a landslide with almost 98% of the vote.

Results

References

1947
gubernatorial
Mississippi
November 1947 events in the United States